Sukanya Krishnan is an American news anchor. She was the morning news anchor on Good Day Wake Up, the early addition before Good Day New York on Fox 5 NY WNYW in New York City, along with Jennifer Lahmers from 2017-2019. She previously anchored for the PIX Morning News on WPIX in New York City, paired with Scott Stanford. She originally joined WPIX on August 8, 2001, left in late 2003 to become one of the four hosts of the syndicated TV show Home Delivery and returned to the WB11 Morning News (later CW11 Morning News, now PIX Morning News) anchor chair in 2005.

In 2006, Krishnan won her first Emmy for On-Camera Achievement (News Anchor/Host) from the New York Chapter of the National Academy of Television Arts and Sciences (NATAS).

In 2020, Krishnan hosted the TLC show Find Love Live and in 2021, she became the host of 90 Day Fiancé: Love Games, a dating and relationships show on Discovery+ streaming service.

Family and early life

Born in Madras, India (now Chennai), Krishnan grew up on Staten Island and attended New Dorp High School. 1993, she graduated from Dickinson College with a bachelor's degree in Spanish.

Krishnan's prior experience in the New York news market included a stint at WCBS-TV, from June 1997 to July 2001 as a general assignment reporter. In 1995 she was an anchor, reporter and producer of the 6 pm and 11 pm news broadcasts at ABC affiliate WUTR-TV in Utica, New York. She cut her teeth in broadcasting at Long Island's WLIG-TV in 1994. Prior to joining WCBS-TV, she was a morning/noon anchor and reporter for WHP-TV, Harrisburg, Pennsylvania's CBS affiliate. She covered various stories including TWA Flight 800, the "Million Man March" and the floods of 1996 which wreaked havoc on central Pennsylvania. While at WCBS-TV, Krishnan covered breaking news for CBS 2's 5, 6 and 11 p.m. newscasts. 

In addition to her Emmy Award, Krishnan has also won the Project Impact (formerly Indian American Political Awareness Committee)'s "Creating A Voice" Award, and a Distinguished Broadcast Journalist commendation from the Office of the Comptroller of the City of New York, for her work covering the immediate aftermath of the September 11 attacks. Her community volunteering includes being a celebrity judge for the 2005 Iron Skillet Cookoff. In March 2004, Krishnan played a reporter covering the mob on the "Two Tonys" episode of HBO's The Sopranos.

In July 2006, she was honored at the FeTNA (Federation of Tamil Sangams of North America) annual convention held in New York City. On October 9, 2007, Krishnan was named one of the 2007 Power Women by New York Moves Magazine, at an awards ceremony hosted by Mira Sorvino and MC'd by  Judy Gold. 

On May 3, 2017, at the end of the PIX11 6-9 Morning News, she announced her final weeks as one of the station's co-anchors. Her last day on-air was Thursday, May 18, 2017.

On August 21, 2017, Sukanya Krishnan joined Fox 5 news WNYW as one of the new morning anchors of Good Day Wake Up from, 4:30am-7am, replacing Teresa Priolo and Antwan Lewis.

See also
 Indians in the New York City metropolitan area
 New Yorkers in journalism

References

External links
 WPIX Official Bio
 "Good Morning, New York: Sukanya Krishnan ’93 takes Big Apple’s a.m. news by storm", Barbara Snyder Stambaugh, Dickinson Magazine, Volume 81, Number 1, Summer 2003
 About Home Delivery
 South Asian Journalists Association profile
 Opportunity Knocks: "Sukanya Krishnan Lives Her Dream, While Helping Others Attain Theirs", by Elaine G. Flores, ABCD Lady Online, Sept. 2004.

1971 births
American Hindus
American television journalists
American writers of Indian descent
Living people
People from Chennai
Indian emigrants to the United States
People from Staten Island
Dickinson College alumni
Television anchors from New York City
New York (state) television reporters
American women television journalists
New Dorp High School alumni
21st-century American women